Ede is a municipality and a town in the centre of the Netherlands, in the province of Gelderland.  Ede had 119,186 inhabitants.

Population centres 
Community: 
 Bennekom
 De Klomp
 Deelen
 Ede (town)
 Ederveen
 Harskamp
 Hoenderloo
 Lunteren
 Otterlo (Kröller-Müller Museum)
 Wekerom

The village of Ede

Location 

The village itself is situated halfway between the larger cities of Arnhem and Utrecht, with direct rail and road connections to both cities. There are no connections to any water nearby; however, there also is a direct road connection to the city of Wageningen which hosts a small industrial port on the river Rijn and a direct road and rail connection to the city of Arnhem, which features a larger port at a greater distance. The environment is clean and green due to the fact that Ede is partly built in a forest and partly on the central Dutch plains in the national park called Nationaal Park "De Hoge Veluwe".

Economy 
Economically, the town of Ede is doing fairly well thanks to the proximity of major highways and railways which offer fast connections to the port of Rotterdam, Schiphol airport and the Ruhr Area in Germany. The main sources of employment used to be a factory belonging to the Dutch Enka company and the three military bases situated in the east of the town. The factory, however, has been closed and the military bases are largely underused since conscription was abolished. The town's economy is lately becoming more focused on national tourism from the more densely populated western cities like Amsterdam and The Hague, and on education such as local colleges and the large Wageningen University in the city of Wageningen.

Some of the more notable or larger companies and other employers in and around Ede are:

 Fruit juice and drinks-factory Riedel (juices and fruit drinks).
 Plant and flower auction house Plantion (since 1 March 2010).
 Advertising agency Lukkien who developed their own heliport on the roof of their office.
 The Dutch headquarters for Kimberly-Clark.
 The Dutch headquarters of mattress and pillow manufacturer Tempur-Pedic.
 Deli-XL, a foodservice distributor in Belgium and the Netherlands. 
 The head office and two of the main datacentres of independent internet provider BIT.

 The world headquarters of organ manufacturer Johannus Orgelbouw and the Global Organ Group.

Transportation
Ede is situated along the A12 motorway and has a direct link to the A1 via the A30.

There are two railway stations in Ede: Ede-Wageningen railway station and Ede Centrum railway station. Ede-Wageningen is the main station with services to Alkmaar, Amersfoort, Amsterdam, Amsterdam Airport Schiphol, Arnhem, Barneveld, Den Helder and Utrecht.

Ede Centrum is served by trains from Amersfoort and Barneveld to Ede-Wageningen.

Education 
There are four secondary schools in Ede: Marnix College, Pallas Athene College, two divisions of Het Streek, and  Aeres VMBO. In addition, Ede has a university of applied sciences, the Christian University of Applied Sciences Ede (Christelijke Hogeschool Ede).

Recently, a primary college focused on the equivalent of basic education named Technova College (formerly known as ROC A12) has been gaining interest and popularity since renovations started in 2015.

Social life 
Each year, in the last week of August, there is a municipality-wide celebration called Heideweek (Week of the heather). It largely involves traditional Dutch festivities, along with local customs. During the week, a Queen of the heather and a Princess of the heather are elected from several candidates and will be the representative for the municipality of Ede on various other festivities, until next year when a new queen and princess are elected.

Notable residents

 Arthur F.E. van Schendel (1910–1979) a Dutch art historian and museum director
 Bert de Vries (born 1938) a retired Dutch politician and economist; lives in Bennekom
 Hans Dorrestijn (born 1940), writer and comedian
 Roel Robbertsen (born 1948) a Dutch politician and pig farmer, Mayor of Ede 2002 to 2007
 Cees van der Knaap (born 1951) a Dutch politician; Mayor of Ede 2008 to 2017
 Hans L. Bodlaender (born 1960) a Dutch computer scientist and academic
 Flora Lagerwerf-Vergunst (born 1964) a Dutch judge and former politician and educator
 Tamara Bos (born 1967) a Dutch screenwriter
 Marianne Thieme (born 1972), politician, author and animal rights activist

Sport 

 Dick Schoenaker (born 1952), a retired football midfielder with about 430 club caps
 Hennie Top (born 1956) a former professional cyclist, competed at the 1984 Summer Olympics 
 John Scherrenburg (born 1963), a retired water polo player, competed at the 1992 Summer Olympics
 Angela Postma (born 1971), a former freestyle swimmer, competed at the 1996 Summer Olympics
 Sonja Tol (born 1972), a Dutch épée fencer, competed at the 2004 Summer Olympics
 Benno Kuipers (born 1974), a former breaststroke swimmer, 18 times Dutch Champion
 Jaap van Lagen (born 1976) a Dutch racing driver
 Esmeral Tunçluer (born 1980), a Dutch-Turkish former basketball player
 Diederik van Silfhout (born 1988) a dressage rider, competed at the 2016 Summer Olympics
 Bibiane Schoofs (born 1988), a Dutch professional tennis player; lives in Ede
 Ruben Knab (born 1988) a Dutch rower, competed at the 2012 Summer Olympics

Gallery

Climate

References

External links 

 

 
Municipalities of Gelderland
Populated places in Gelderland